Martín Siri (born April 20, 1979 in Buenos Aires) is an Argentine cricketer.

He is a right-handed batsman and a right-arm medium-pace bowler who has played for Argentina since 2000.

Siri debuted against Canada in the 2000 Americas Championship and played frequently in the competition, in which Argentina won one game and finished fifth in the table.

In February 2006, Siri helped Argentina to victory in the ICC World Cricket League Americas Region Division Two, though he was not present in the same competition in August, when Argentina finished bottom of the table with no victories. Siri is an upper-middle-order batsman.

He played in the 2013 ICC World Cricket League Division Six tournament. He made his Twenty20 International (T20I) debut for Argentina, against Peru, in the men's tournament of the 2019 South American Cricket Championship on 4 October 2019. In November 2021, he was named in Argentina's squad for the 2021 ICC Men's T20 World Cup Americas Qualifier tournament in Antigua.

References

External links
 

1979 births
Living people
Argentine cricketers
Argentina Twenty20 International cricketers
Cricketers from Buenos Aires